Assassin's Creed is a 2016 dystopian science fiction action film based on the video game franchise of the same name. The film is directed by Justin Kurzel, written by Michael Lesslie, Adam Cooper and Bill Collage, and stars Michael Fassbender (who also produced), as well as Marion Cotillard, Jeremy Irons, Brendan Gleeson, Charlotte Rampling and Michael K. Williams. The film is set in the same universe as the video games but features an original story that expands the series' mythology. The plot revolves around Callum "Cal" Lynch (Fassbender), who is abducted by the Abstergo Foundation because of his heritage. Cal's ancestor, Aguilar de Nerha, was a member of the Assassin Brotherhood—a fictional organization inspired by the real-life Order of Assassins—active during the Spanish Inquisition in the late 15th-century, who swore to protect the Apple of Eden, an artifact believed to contain the key to humanity's free will. Cal must accept his Assassin heritage and stop Abstergo, the Templar Order of the modern-day, from finding the Apple and using it to enslave humanity.

Filming began in late August 2015 and concluded in January 2016. Assassin's Creed was released by 20th Century Fox on December 21, 2016, in the United States and France. It generally received negative reviews from critics that were primarily aimed towards the plot and writing, though some considered it an improvement over previous video game film adaptations. The film underperformed at the box office, grossing $240 million worldwide against its $125 million budget. A sequel was planned, but due to the film's negative reception, it was cancelled by Disney after its acquisition of 21st Century Fox in 2019.

Plot
In 1492 Andalusia, during the Granada War, Aguilar de Nerha is accepted into the Assassin Brotherhood and assigned to protect Prince Ahmed de Granada from the Templar Order. In 1986, adolescent Callum "Cal" Lynch finds his mother killed by his father, Joseph, a modern-day Assassin. Gunmen led by Alan Rikkin, CEO of the Templars' Abstergo Foundation, arrive to capture Joseph, who persuades his son to escape.

In 2016, Cal is sentenced to death for murdering a pimp, but Abstergo fakes his execution and takes him to their research facility in Madrid. He is told the Templars are searching for an Apple of Eden, one of many artifacts built by a long-lost civilization, in order to eliminate violence by using the Apple's code to control humanity's free will. Sofia, Alan's daughter and the head scientist, reveals that Cal is a descendant of Aguilar, the last person confirmed to be in possession of the Apple. She puts Cal in the Animus, a machine which allows him to relive (and the scientists to observe) Aguilar's genetic memories, so that Abstergo can learn the Apple's whereabouts.

In 1492, Aguilar and his partner, Maria, are deployed to rescue Ahmed, who has been kidnapped by the Templar Grand Master Tomas de Torquemada, to coerce Ahmed's father, Sultan Muhammad XII, to surrender the Apple. Aguilar and Maria intercept the Templars, but are overpowered and captured by Torquemada's enforcer, Ojeda. Cal is quickly pulled out of the Animus by Sofia.

Cal encounters other Assassin descendants held captive at the facility, most of whom are suspicious of his motives, with the exceptions of Lin, a descendant of 16th-century Chinese Assassin Shao Jun; and Moussa, a descendant of 18th-century Haitian Assassin Baptiste. Cal begins experiencing hallucinations, dubbed "the Bleeding Effect", of both Aguilar and Joseph. Cal and Sofia build a rapport during their sessions; she confides that her mother was likewise murdered by an Assassin, sharing his hatred of the Brotherhood .

Back in the Animus, Aguilar and Maria are scheduled for execution at an auto da fe but he manages to free them, leading to a rooftop chase in which they escape through a "Leap of Faith". Cal's mind reacts violently to the session and he is temporarily paralyzed. When Cal learns that Joseph is also at the facility, he confronts him over his mother's death. Joseph informs Cal that the Bleeding Effect will allow him to gain Aguilar's skills. He also reveals that Cal's mother was an Assassin, and she chose to die by Joseph's hand rather than be forced into the Animus. Unconvinced, Cal vows to destroy the Assassins by finding the Apple. Meanwhile, Alan is pressed by a Templar Elder, Ellen Kaye, to shut down the multibillion-dollar Animus Project because they have already "won ... people no longer care about their civil liberties ... they're content to follow", leading Sofia to question her father's true intentions.

Reaffirmed by his encounter with Joseph, Cal willingly enters the Animus. Aguilar and Maria ambush a meeting between Muhammad and Torquemada; they kill Torquemada's men and recover the Apple, but Ojeda captures Maria. She chooses to die to protect the Apple and stabs herself on Ojeda's blade, allowing Aguilar to kill Ojeda and escape through another Leap; the force of which causes the Animus to violently malfunction. Aguilar later gives the Apple to Christopher Columbus, who vows to take it to his grave. When Moussa and the modern Assassin prisoners start a riot in order to escape, Alan orders the facility purged. Abstergo security kills Joseph and most of the other prisoners. Cal stands in the Animus chamber and is met with projections of his ancestors, including Aguilar, Arno Dorian, Joseph and his mother, while Sofia glimpses the projection of an Assassin resembling her. Persuaded by his mother, Cal embraces his Assassin heritage and, having fully assimilated Aguilar's abilities, joins Moussa and Lin in escaping the facility.

Having retrieved the Apple from Columbus' burial vault, the Templars convene at a ceremony in their London sanctuary to celebrate their triumph. Inside the sanctuary, a disillusioned Sofia meets Cal, who has come to take the Apple, and she reluctantly allows him to act. Cal retrieves the Apple, killing Alan in the process. As Sofia vows revenge, the Assassins depart, swearing once again to protect the Apple from the Templars.

Cast
 Michael Fassbender as Callum "Cal" Lynch and Aguilar de Nerha:An original character created for the film, Cal is a descendant of the Assassins, with genetic links to Aguilar, an Assassin active in 15th-century Spain. Cal has been running his whole life, ever since he witnessed his mother's murder as a child. But living on society's fringes has also kept him shrouded from the secrets of his ancestry. Awaiting execution on death row, Cal is captured and brought to the Abstergo Foundation's facility in Madrid, Spain, where he may soon come to understand his place in the world, and control the power burning inside of him. Fassbender described Cal by saying "He doesn't have a lineage he can feel a belonging to ... he's a bit of a lost soul. He's always been drifting in and out of correctional facilities," and conversely described Aguilar as "very much somebody that belongs to the Creed. He has a cause, he's sort of been following that cause. He belongs to it." 
Angus Brown as Young Cal
 Marion Cotillard as Dr. Sofia Rikkin:The daughter of Alan Rikkin and the leading scientist of the Animus project at Abstergo Foundation. Sofia is a brilliant scientist determined to use science to eradicate humanity's violent impulses and create a harmonious world. She might not see the dark underside of the modern-day Templars' causes, and her allegiance is yet to be tested. Marion Cotillard described Sofia's relationship with her father as "twisted". Their relationship is distant, and she tries everything to make him proud," she explains. "But at the same time, she starts to understand that they're not really on the same page. The most important thing for her is not to impress her father. It's to achieve what she started."
 Jeremy Irons as Alan Rikkin:The CEO of Abstergo Industries, one of the leaders of modern-day Templars, and the father of Sofia, whom he loves deeply, even if he often struggles to show it. He leads his own subsidiary organization, Abstergo Foundation, which is dedicated to the "perfection" of humankind.  Determined to achieve the Templars' centuries-long goal to control all of humanity, Rikkin believes that through Cal and the ancestral memories he holds, he may finally achieve ultimate power for the betterment of humanity. Irons described the character as "a mover and a shaker. A shadowy figure. A man who is very much at the forefront of this world." Like Sofia, Rikkin believes in "removing the violent impulse all men carry", and sees an opportunity in Cal. "Rikkin believes the cause of unhappiness in the world is war, and if he can get rid of that then people like him will be safer and wealthier. He's not a very moral man, but he thinks he is." The character previously had a minor speaking role in the first Assassin's Creed game. 
 Brendan Gleeson as Joseph Lynch:Cal's father and a member of the modern-day Assassin Brotherhood, also held prisoner at the Abstergo Foundation facility.
Brian Gleeson as Young Joseph.
 Charlotte Rampling as Ellen Kaye:A senior member of the Templar Elders, referred to as "Your Excellency", who is looking to re-purpose Abstergo's multibillion-dollar annual budget used for the Animus program.
 Michael K. Williams as Moussa:A captive of the Abstergo Foundation and a descendant of Baptiste, a Haitian Assassin active in 18th-century Louisiana who started his own voodoo cult allied with the Templars after feeling the Brotherhood had betrayed him; he was killed by the Assassin Aveline de Grandpré in 1766. When talking about the character, Williams said, "Moussa definitely has some assassin skills. Although I think he prefers to use trickery and magic and voodoo to slay his opponents as opposed to just hand-to-hand combat, but if it needed to be he could take it to the mat." Baptiste appears in Assassin's Creed III: Liberation.
 Denis Ménochet as McGowen:The head of Abstergo Foundation's security force.
 Essie Davis as Mary Lynch:Cal's mother, Joseph's wife, and a modern-day Assassin. She took her own life with her husband's assistance to prevent Abstergo from using her genetic memories to find the Apple of Eden. Her name is not said in the film, but is briefly shown on a genealogical board and is mentioned in the film's novelization.
 Ariane Labed as Maria:An assassin active in 15th-century Spain and Aguilar's closest ally. More measured than her partner-in-arms, Maria is light on her feet and exceedingly quick, and together they are an unstoppable force. Like Aguilar, she understands the damage the Templar influence is doing to her country.
 Carlos Bardem as Benedicto:The Mentor of the Spanish Assassin Brotherhood in the late 15th-century.
Khalid Abdalla as Sultan Muhammad XII:The last Nasrid ruler of the Emirate of Granada whose defeat in the war against the Catholic Monarchs of Spain in 1492 marked the end of Islamic rule in the Iberian peninsula.
 Javier Gutiérrez as Tomás de Torquemada:Tomas de Torquemada ruled over the Spanish Inquisition for fifteen years, directing his inquisitors to root out and murder those he deemed to be manipulating the faith in their own pursuit of power. The most potent tool in his arsenal was the auto-da-fé: theatrical acts of public penance in which all those who crossed the Inquisition were burned alive.
 Hovik Keuchkerian as Ojeda:While Torquemada pulls the strings, Ojeda does the real work, exacting brutal punishment on any who dare to challenge the Inquisition. He thinks nothing of razing entire towns and commands a great army; however, his lack of subtlety is his weakness, because it allows the Assassins who operate in the shadows to keep their eyes on him at all times.
Matias Varela as Emir:A captive of the Abstergo Foundation and a descendant of Yusuf Tazim, an Ottoman Assassin who led the Brotherhood in Constantinople until his death at the Templars' hands in 1512. Yusuf Tazim appears in Assassin's Creed: Revelations.
 Callum Turner as Nathan:A captive of the Abstergo Foundation and a descendant of Duncan Walpole, an English Assassin active during the Golden Age of Piracy, who defected to the Templars due to his dissatisfaction with the Brotherhood and was killed by the pirate Edward Kenway in 1715. Duncan Walpole appears in Assassin's Creed IV: Black Flag.
 Michelle H. Lin as Lin:A captive of the Abstergo Foundation and a descendant of Shao Jun, a Chinese Assassin who vanquished the Templars and rebuilt the Brotherhood in China in the early 16th-century. Shao Jun appears in Assassin's Creed: Embers and Assassin's Creed Chronicles: China.

Production

Development

In October 2011, Sony Pictures was in final negotiations with Ubisoft Motion Pictures to make a film version of Assassin's Creed, to be released in 3D. In July 2012, Michael Fassbender was announced to star in the film, as well as co-produce, through his DMC Film banner, with Conor McCaughan. Jean-Julien Baronnet, CEO of Ubisoft Motion Pictures, said Fassbender was the studio's first choice to star in the film. As well, negotiations between Sony Pictures and Ubisoft Motion Pictures were put on hold, with Ubisoft executives planning to develop the film independently in order to maintain greater creative control. Sony was able to still distribute the film, but Ubisoft Motion Pictures would not resume talks until packaging the project with a writer and director. In October 2012, Ubisoft revealed the film would be co-produced with New Regency and distributed by 20th Century Fox. New Regency financed part of the film's production, in order for Ubisoft to not shoulder much financial risk, yet still be able to be involved creatively; RatPac Entertainment and Alpha Pictures also co-financed the film. Baronnet also revealed Ubisoft hoped to release the film along with a new game launch for the series.

In January 2013, Michael Lesslie was hired to write the film. In June 2013, Frank Marshall entered negotiations to produce the film, along with Fassbender and McCaughan, for DMC Film, and Eli Richbourg for Ubisoft. In July, Scott Frank revealed he was rewriting the script. In January 2014, a LinkedIn profile for executive producer Fannie Pailloux stated filming was scheduled to begin in August 2014. In April 2014, Adam Cooper and Bill Collage were hired to rewrite the script. By the end of April, Justin Kurzel was in talks to direct. In June, Olivia Munn expressed interest in appearing in the film.

Pre-production
The film was originally projected to be the first of several films. On February 12, 2015, Ubisoft's CEO Yves Guillemot confirmed that New Regency had begun production on the film. The following day, Marion Cotillard revealed that she had joined the cast. Filming was expected to begin in late 2015. In April 2015, Fassbender revealed that filming was scheduled to begin in September 2015. In May 2015, Alicia Vikander was in talks to star in the film, though in the following month, she took a role in the fifth Bourne film, Jason Bourne, instead, and Ariane Labed was cast in her place. Producers on the film include Baronnet, Patrick Crowley, Fassbender, Marshall, Conor McCaughan, and Arnon Milchan. In July 2015, Michael K. Williams was added to the cast. Initially thought to be cast as recurring protagonist Desmond Miles, Ubisoft clarified in July 2012 that Fassbender would play a different character instead. In late August 2015, Fassbender's role was revealed as Callum Lynch in the present day and Aguilar in 15th-century Spain; filming locations for the film were also announced.

Filming
Principal photography on the film began on August 31, 2015, with filming taking place in Malta, London, Spain, and the 007 Stage at Pinewood Studios. Adam Arkapaw serves as cinematographer, while Andy Nicholson was production designer. In October 2015, Jeremy Irons and Brendan Gleeson joined the cast. In December 2015, shooting took place in Spain, and Irons' role was revealed to be Alan Rikkin. Principal filming ended on January 15, 2016, with further filming taking place in Ely Cathedral in July.

Music
In May 2016, it was announced that Jed Kurzel, the brother of director Justin Kurzel, would score the film.

Connections to the video games
Aymar Azaïzia, head of Assassin's Creed content at Ubisoft, stated that the film, which is "a brand new story, [with] new characters set in our universe", had the possibility to feature "some familiar faces", and that the present day element would feature Abstergo. Fassbender said, "We really want to respect the game[s] and the elements to it. But we also wanted to come up with our own thing. And one thing I've sort of learned from doing the franchises like X-Men is that audiences, I think, want to be surprised and to see new elements of what they already know, and different takes on it." The Animus, the machine used to experience ancestors' memories, was redesigned for the film, from a chair, to a machine that lifts the user in the air, allowing for a more modern, interactive and dramatic experience. Fassbender also noted the change was made to avoid comparisons to The Matrix. The Abstergo compound in the film features an artifact room that holds an assortment of weapons from the games beyond the traditional Assassin wrist blades. Fassbender also stated that Ubisoft was "very keen" about elements being created for the film, and were considering incorporating them into future games.

The film also features the games' signature "Leap of Faith" jump, performed by Fassbender's stunt double, Damien Walters, rather than a digital double, as the production team wanted to make many of the elements in the film as "real" as possible, without the use of visual effects. The  freefall was described as "one of the highest freefalls performed by a stuntman in almost 35 years".

Release
Assassin's Creed was released on December 21, 2016. The film was originally announced in May 2013 to be released on May 22, 2015, a date that was pushed back the following month to June 26, 2015. In November 2013, the film was pushed back once again to a new release date of August 7, 2015. In September 2014, the film was pushed to an unspecified 2016 release date, which was later revealed to be December 21, 2016. The film was released in 2D, 3D and selected IMAX 3D territories.

Reception

Box office 
Assassin's Creed grossed $54.6 million in the United States and Canada and $186.3 million in other territories for a worldwide total of $240.9 million, against a production budget of $125 million. The Hollywood Reporter estimated the film lost the studio $75–100 million, when factoring together all expenses and revenues.

In North America, Assassin's Creed opened alongside Sing and Passengers, and was initially expected to gross $25–35 million from 2,902 theaters over its first six days of release. However, after grossing $1.4 million from Tuesday night previews and $4.6 million on its first day, six-day projections were lowered to $22 million. It went on to gross $10.3 million in its opening weekend (a six-day total of $22.5 million), finishing fifth at the box office. It fell 15% in its second weekend to $8.7 million, finishing in eighth, and over 50% in its third week, grossing $4.2 million and finishing tenth.

Critical reception 
The website's critical consensus reads, "Assassin's Creed is arguably better made (and certainly better cast) than most video game adaptations; unfortunately, the CGI-fueled end result is still a joylessly overplotted slog." On Metacritic, the film has a score of 36 out of 100 based on 38 critics, indicating "generally unfavorable reviews". Audiences polled by CinemaScore gave the film an average grade of "B+" on an A+ to F scale.

Peter Bradshaw of The Guardian wrote, "I bet playing the game is much more exciting. But then getting Fassbender to slap a coat of Dulux on the wall of his hi-tech prison cell and monitoring the progressive moisture-loss would be more exciting." Robbie Collin of  The Daily Telegraph was equally scathing, saying, "For everyone who thought Dan Brown's conspiracy novels were just lacking a spot of parkour, Assassin's Creed might be your favourite film of the year. But for the clinically sane 99.9 percent of the rest of us, it's rather less exciting."

David Ehrlich of IndieWire gave the film a B−, and said "declaring this to be the best video game movie ever made is the kind of backhanded compliment that sounds like hyperbole, but the description fits the bill on both counts".

Home media
Assassin's Creed was released onto Blu-ray and DVD on March 21, 2017 and Digital HD from Amazon Video and iTunes on March 10, 2017.

Cancelled sequels
In 2016, Daphne Yang, CEO of the film's Taiwanese co-financier CatchPlay, stated that Paramount Pictures and New Regency was looking to turn the film into a franchise, since it is based on "successful Ubisoft games and would make ideal sequels". Two additional films were planned, with the first sequel having entered development during the production of the initial film. Kurzel said that he would like to explore the Cold War in the sequel. Due to the film's negative reception, in the wake of the acquisition of 21st Century Fox's assets by Disney, the sequels, together with other film adaptations of video games, were cancelled.

See also
 List of films based on video games

References

External links
 
 
 

2016 films
2016 3D films
2010s fantasy adventure films
2016 science fiction action films
American fantasy adventure films
American science fiction action films
English-language French films
French fantasy adventure films
French science fiction action films
2010s Spanish-language films
American action adventure films
Cultural depictions of Christopher Columbus
Cultural depictions of Tomás de Torquemada
Inquisition in fiction
Films about secret societies
Films set in 1986
Films set in 2016
Films set in London
Films set in Mexico
Films set in Spain
Films set in Texas
Films set in the 1490s
Films shot at Pinewood Studios
Films shot in London
Films shot in Malta
Films shot in Spain
Films shot in the Balearic Islands
Live-action films based on video games
Parkour in film
Films based on Assassin's Creed
Uxoricide in fiction
20th Century Fox films
Regency Enterprises films
Dune Entertainment films
The Kennedy/Marshall Company films
Films directed by Justin Kurzel
Films produced by Frank Marshall
Films scored by Jed Kurzel
Dystopian films
2010s English-language films
Films produced by Arnon Milchan
2010s American films
2010s French films